Gitano may refer to:

 Gitanos, Romani people in Spain
 Gitano (2000 film), a Spanish film
 Gitano (album), a 2007 album by Rolando Villazón
 Gitano, a 2012 album by Canut Reyes
 Gitano Group Inc., a fashion apparel company, USA